The Balkhi is a domesticated breed of sheep found in Afghanistan and North-western Pakistan.  This breed is of the fat-tailed mutton type.  Though this breed does grow wool, it is primarily raised for meat.

Characteristics

The Balkhi displays black, tan or grey. This breed has a low fiber density.

The ears are somewhat long, the body is muscular and compact.  The tail is fat and tucked.  Both sexes are horned.

On average at maturity, rams weigh  and ewes . Ewes lactate for about 105 days and produce  of milk on average during this period. At birth, rams weigh  and ewes weigh .

References

Sheep breeds originating in Afghanistan
Sheep breeds originating in Pakistan